Nafcillin sodium is a narrow-spectrum beta-lactam antibiotic of the penicillin class. As a beta-lactamase-resistant penicillin, it is used to treat infections caused by Gram-positive bacteria, in particular, species of staphylococci that are resistant to other penicillins.

Nafcillin is considered therapeutically equivalent to oxacillin, although one retrospective study found greater rates of hypokalemia and acute kidney injury in patients taking nafcillin compared to patients taking oxacillin.

Indications
Nafcillin is indicated in the treatment of staphylococcal infections, except those caused by MRSA.

U.S. clinical practice guidelines recommend either nafcillin or oxacillin as the first-line treatment of choice for staphylococcal endocarditis in patients without artificial heart valves.

Side-effects
As with all penicillins, serious life-threatening allergic reactions can occur. 

Milder side-effects include:
 Hypokalemia
 Nausea and vomiting
 Diarrhea, often due to suppression of normal gastrointestinal bacteria, which, on occasion, leads to a more serious super-infection with an organism like Clostridium difficile
 Abdominal pain
 Yeast infections (thrush) affecting the mouth and tongue or vagina
 Agranulocytosis, neutropenia

Interactions
There is evidence that nafcillin induces cytochrome P-450 enzymes, specifically CYP2C9. Several drugs with a narrow therapeutic window, such as warfarin and nifedipine, are metabolized by CYP2C9.

Nafcillin contains salts added as stability media. These added salts could cause edema or fluid accumulation. It would be prudent to avoid this medication if there were a concern for a congestive heart failure or kidney disease.

References

CYP3A4 inducers
Penicillins
Naphthol ethers